The list of ship launches in 1949 includes a chronological list of all ships launched in 1949.



References 

Sources

1949
Ship launches